Art Roth may also refer to:

 Arthur Roth,  Olympic athlete
 Arthur T. Roth, American banker